The electrochemical reduction of carbon dioxide, also known as electrolysis of carbon dioxide, is the conversion of carbon dioxide to more reduced chemical species using electrical energy. It is one possible step in the broad scheme of carbon capture and utilization, nevertheless it is deemed to be one of the most promising approaches.

Electrochemical reduction of carbon dioxide represents a possible means of producing chemicals or fuels, converting carbon dioxide to organic feedstocks such as formic acid (HCOOH), carbon monoxide (CO), methane (CH4), ethylene (C2H4) and ethanol (C2H5OH). Among the more selective metallic catalysts in this field are tin for formic acid, silver for carbon monoxide and copper for methane, ethylene or ethanol. Methanol, propanol and 1-butanol have also been produced via CO2 electrochemical reduction, albeit in small quantities.

The first examples of electrochemical reduction of carbon dioxide are from the 19th century, when carbon dioxide was reduced to carbon monoxide using a zinc cathode. Research in this field intensified in the 1980s following the oil embargoes of the 1970s. As of 2021, pilot-scale carbon dioxide electrochemical reduction is being developed by several companies, including Siemens, Dioxide Materials, Twelve and GIGKarasek. The techno-economic analysis was recently conducted to assess the key technical gaps and commercial potentials of the carbon dioxide electrolysis technology at near ambient conditions.

Chemicals from carbon dioxide 
In carbon fixation, plants convert carbon dioxide into sugars, from which many biosynthetic pathways originate.  The catalyst responsible for this conversion, RuBisCO, is the most common protein. Some anaerobic organisms employ enzymes to convert CO2 to carbon monoxide, from which fatty acids can be made.

In industry, a few products are made from CO2, including urea, salicylic acid, methanol, and certain inorganic and organic carbonates. In the laboratory, carbon dioxide is sometimes used to prepare carboxylic acids in a process known as carboxylation. No electrochemical CO2 electrolyzer that operates at room temperature has been commercialized. Elevated temperature solid oxide electrolyzer cells (SOECs) for CO2 reduction to CO are commercially available. For example, Haldor Topsoe offers SOECs for CO2 reduction with a reported 6-8 kWh per Nm3 CO produced and purity up to 99.999% CO.

Hydrosilanes reduce carbon dioxide (to methane): Unfortunately such reactions are stoichiometric and exclusively of academic interest.

Electrocatalysis
The electrochemical reduction of carbon dioxide to various products is usually described as:

The redox potentials for these reactions are similar to that for hydrogen evolution in aqueous electrolytes, thus electrochemical reduction of CO2 is usually competitive with hydrogen evolution reaction.

Electrochemical methods have gained significant attention: 1) at ambient pressure and room temperature; 2) in connection with renewable energy sources (see also solar fuel) 3) competitive controllability, modularity and scale-up are relatively simple. The electrochemical reduction or electrocatalytic conversion of CO2 can produce value-added chemicals such methane, ethylene, ethanol, etc., and the products are mainly dependent on the selected catalysts and operating potentials (applying reduction voltage).

A variety of homogeneous and heterogeneous catalysts have been evaluated. Many such processes are assumed to operate via the intermediacy of metal carbon dioxide complexes. Many processes suffer from high overpotential, low current efficiency, low selectivity, slow kinetics, and/or poor catalyst stability.

The composition of the electrolyte can be decisive. Gas-diffusion electrodes are beneficial.

See also 
Electromethanogenesis
Biobattery
Electrofuel
Lemon battery
Photoelectrochemical reduction of carbon dioxide
Photochemical reduction of carbon dioxide
Electrolysis of water
Electrochemical energy conversion
Bioelectrochemical reactor

Notes

References

Further reading 
 
 
 

Carbon dioxide
Electrolysis
Energy engineering
Electrochemical engineering